Kazakhstan–Russia relations are the bilateral foreign relations between Kazakhstan and the Russian Federation. Kazakhstan has an embassy in Moscow, a consulate-general in Saint Petersburg, Astrakhan and Omsk. Russia has an embassy in Astana and consulates in Almaty and Oral.

Country comparison

Overview

Kazakhstan and Russia are both founding members of the  Shanghai Cooperation Organisation, the Collective Security Treaty Organization, and are additionally part of the Euro-Atlantic Partnership Council and the Commonwealth of Independent States. Both also founded the Eurasian Economic Union with Belarus. Following the collapse of the USSR, the issue of nuclear weapons was central to diplomatic relations between Kazakhstan and Russia, the West and the broader international community.

In recent years, Kazakhstan has attempted to balance ties between both sides by selling petroleum and natural gas to its northern neighbor at artificially low prices, allowing heavy investment from Russian businesses, and concluding an agreement over the Baikonur Cosmodrome while simultaneously assisting the West in the War on Terror.

According to a survey conducted by the Central Asia Barometer between 2017 and 2019, 87% of Kazakhs have a favorable view of Russia, with 8% holding an unfavorable view. The survey also found that 88 percent support closer relations with Russia, compared to 6 percent who do not.

History

During the reign of Kasym Khan from 1511 to 1521, the Tsardom of Russia became the first major state to establish diplomatic relations with the Kazakh Khanate.

20th century
When the USSR dissolved in 1991, it left a Soviet biological weapons program and a Soviet nuclear weapons program (Semipalatinsk Test Site) in Russia, Kazakhstan, Uzbekistan, Georgia, Azerbaijan, and Ukraine. Seeing a large peace dividend, the Bush administration passed such legislation as the Soviet Nuclear Threat Reduction Act of 1991 and over the next 15 years spent more than $400 million on the Nunn–Lugar Cooperative Threat Reduction and Biological Threat Reduction program, of which the Stepnogorsk Scientific and Technical Institute for Microbiology was a large recipient.

Since 2000
In January 2005 President of Russia Vladimir Putin and Kazakh President Nursultan Nazarbayev signed an agreement approving an official map of the border. On May 23, 2009, the two countries placed their first boundary marker on the  border between Kazakhstan's Atyrau and Russia's Astrakhan provinces. The demarcation is expected to take 10 to 15 years to complete.

Putin's 2013 comments on Kazakh statehood 
In 2013, President Vladimir Putin raised controversy when he claimed that “Kazakhs had never had statehood”, in what seemed to be an apparent response to growing nationalism among Kazakhstanis. Putin's remarks on the matter led to a severe response from President Nazarbayev, who announced that the country would celebrate the 550th anniversary of the Kazakh Khanate, which effectively refutes Putin's claim that a Kazakh nation has never existed. He also threatened to withdraw from the Eurasian Economic Union, saying that the independence of the country is his "most precious treasure" and that Kazakhs "will never surrender" their independence.

In December 2020, Putin's derogatory comments were repeated by at least two Russian lawmakers.

2022 anti-government protests
At the request of Tokayev government, Russia participated in the CSTO Peacekeeping Force effort to quell the anti-government protests on 6 January 2022. The Russian forces included units of the Airborne Troops and the air transport  of the Russian Aerospace Forces. On 13 January the CSTO forces began to withdraw. On 19 January the withdrawal was complete. There are roughly 1,000 Russian troops in Kazakhstan according to Ukraine's Main Directorate of Intelligence of Ukraine's Ministry of Defense.

2022 Russian invasion of Ukraine
Kazakhstan–Russia relations deteriorated greatly upon the Russian invasion of Ukraine. Kazakh leadership including Kazakh Foreign Minister Mukhtar Tleuberdi condemned the invasion and refused to recognize the Russian states of Donetsk People's Republic and Luhansk People's Republic.

In addition to sending aid to Ukraine, the Kazakh military increased spending and training, in anticipation of possible Russian aggressions.

Russia suspended shipments of Kazakh oil after Tokayev’s statements at the St. Petersburg International Economic Forum, where he stated that Kazakhstan considered the DPR and LPR as “quasi-state entities” and would not recognize them.

Following the 2022 Russian mobilization, Kazakhstan received a large influx of Russians leaving to avoid being conscripted to fight in Ukraine. President Tokayev ordered his government to help the Russians who were leaving "because of the current hopeless situation", and that it was "a political and a humanitarian issue." In January 2023, Kazakhstan announced they were tightening visa rules, a move that is expected to make it more difficult for Russians to remain in the country.

Trade relations 
Overall money flow in a trade between Kazakhstan-Russia in 2018 was $18,219,255,476, which is more than 2017's numbers by  5.68%. Export to Kazakhstan was: $12,923,333,532 which is more than 2017's numbers by  4.86%. Export to Russia was: $5,295,921,944 which is more than 2017's numbers by 7.71%.

Main products of trade are: machinery, mineral products, metal, chemicals, agricultural supplies, shoes. The influx of Russian direct investment in the Republic of Kazakhstan for the period 2005–2014. amounted to 9.1 billion US dollars, and Kazakhstan in Russia - 2.9 billion US dollars.

One of the most active and large scale relations are in fuel sphere. The transit of Kazakh oil through Russia is also carried out within the framework of the Caspian Pipeline Consortium (CPC). At 50 percent, CPC is owned by the governments of Russia and Kazakhstan, and by 50 percent - by mining companies that financed the commissioning of the first phase of the project.

Big Russian companies like Lukoil ($5 billion), Gazprom ($1 billion), INTER RAO UES ($0.2 billion) Rusal ($0.4 billion), Rosatom State Corporation, Rosneft OJSC, Bank VTB OJSC, VEB, Mechel OJSC, Severstal OJSC invest in Kazakhstan's economy.

See also
Kazakhs in Russia
Russians in Kazakhstan
New Great Game
Foreign relations of Kazakhstan
Foreign relations of Russia
Petroleum politics
Kazakhstan–Russia border

References

Further reading
Uneasy Alliance: Relations Between Russia and Kazakhstan in the Post-Soviet Era, 1992-1997. Greenwood Publishing Group.

 
Russia
Bilateral relations of Russia
Relations of colonizer and former colony